The  were a group of fourteen kaibōkan escort vessels built for the Imperial Japanese Navy during World War II. Eight of the fourteen ships were sunk during the war.

Background
The Shimushu-class kaibōkan, as with the  torpedo boat, was a consequence of  the 1930 London Naval Treaty, which placed limitations on the total destroyer tonnage the Imperial Japanese Navy was permitted. A new class of vessel was designed to use this loophole, and was given the obsolete designation of kaibōkan (Kai = sea, ocean, Bo = defence, Kan = ship), which had previously been used to designate obsolete battleships which had been reassigned to coastal defense duties. Immediately before the start of then Pacific War, the Imperial Japanese Navy suddenly decided to give more priority to convoy escorts, possibly in light of the ongoing successes of German U-boats against British shipping in the Atlantic. As the Shimushu class was not suited for mass-production and took too long to build, the 1941 Rapid Naval Armaments Supplement Programme authorized thirty modified versions of the Shimushu class, which were designated the Etorofu class. However, sixteen of the projected thirty ships were subsequently re-ordered to the subsequent Mikura, Hiburi or Ukura designs.

Production began between February 1942 and August 1943. Despite simplification, the design was still too complex for mass production and one of the ships was not completed until early 1944.

Description
The Etorofu class was almost identical to the Shimushu class but with a simplified bow, stern and bridge structure to facilitate production.

As with the Shimushu class the  main battery of the Etorofu class consisted of three Type 3  guns in single mounts, one superfiring pair aft and one mount forward of the superstructure. Anti-aircraft protection was by four Type 96  anti-aircraft guns in two twin-gun mounts abreast the bridge. However, for a ship supposedly designed for convoy escort, only one Model 94 depth charge launcher was installed on the quarterdeck along with a Model 3 loading frame.  The number of depth charges was initially 36, but this was increased to 60 while the ships were still in production, which necessitated the deletion of the two paravanes initially in the design for minesweeping. The ships were also equipped with a Model 93 sonar and a Type 93 hydrophone.

During the Pacific War, the number of Type 96 anti-aircraft gun was increased to five triple-mounts and a varying number of single-mounts, up to 15 in total by August 1943. A Type 22 and Type 13 radar were also installed. Aa Type 97  trench mortar was also installed front of the bridge

Operational service
The Etorofu class proved to be an inadequate design by the time the final units entered service in 1944. Their speed was slower than most submarines, and with only one depth charge projector, their combat capability against the increasingly effective United States Navy submarine forces was ineffective. The  Etorofu-class vessels were mostly deployed to the South China Sea or East China Sea as convoy escorts, but few recorded any attacks against Allied submarines. Conversely, six of the 14 ships in the class were sunk by American submarines. Of the six survivors, three were used as repatriation ships after the war, and were subsequently given as prize of war to Allied navies.

Ships in class
Thirty ships (numbered #310 to #339) were included in the Rapid Naval Armaments Supplement Programme in 1941. These are listed below with the shipyard to which each was allocated:

While fourteen of the above ships were completed to the Etorofu design, eight ships - Mikura (#320), Miyake (#322), Awaji (#324), Nōmi (#326), Kurahashi (#327), Chiburi (#329), Yashiro (#331) and Kusagaki (#334) - were altered to be built to the Mikura design; three ships - Hiburi (#328), Daitō (#333) and Shōnan (#339) - were altered to be built to the Hiburi design; and five ships - Ukuru (#332), Okinawa (#335), Amami (#336), Aguni (#337) and Shinnan (#338) - were altered to be built to the 'Ukuru design. The fourteen completed to the (original) Etorofu design were as follows:

Notes

References

External links 

 Combined Fleet: Etorofu

Etorofu
 
Ships of the Republic of China Navy
Ships of the People's Liberation Army Navy